John Kamau (born 13 May 1947) is a Kenyan boxer. He competed in the men's flyweight event at the 1964 Summer Olympics. At the 1964 Summer Olympics, he defeated Tibor Papp of Hungary, before losing to Artur Olech of Poland.

References

1947 births
Living people
Kenyan male boxers
Olympic boxers of Kenya
Boxers at the 1964 Summer Olympics
Place of birth missing (living people)
Flyweight boxers